The Tahirih Justice Center, or Tahirih, is a national charitable non-governmental organization headquartered in Falls Church, Virginia, United States that aims to protect immigrant women and girls fleeing gender-based violence and persecution. Tahirih's holistic model combines free legal services and social services case management with public policy advocacy, training and education.

Since its founding in 1997, Tahirih has answered more than 25,000 pleas for help from individuals seeking protection from human rights abuses, such as female genital cutting, domestic violence, human trafficking, torture and rape.

Tahirih is inspired by principles of the Baháʼí Faith, including the belief that equality between women and men is necessary for peace and unity in society. The organization is named after Táhirih, an influential female poet and theologian in 19th-century Persia who campaigned for women's rights.

History

Founding
Layli Miller-Muro founded the Tahirih Justice Center in 1997 following the Matter of Kasinga, a landmark asylum case in which Miller-Muro was involved as a law student.

At the age of 17, Fauziya Kassindja fled her origin country of Togo and sought asylum in the United States to escape a forced polygamous marriage and imminent female genital mutilation/cutting (FGM/C). She went through Ghana and Germany before arriving at Newark Liberty International Airport in New Jersey, where she immediately requested asylum. Kassindja was detained by the Immigration and Naturalization Service (INS) until 1996. Although an Immigration Judge initially found Kassindja "excludable as an intending immigrant, denied her applications for asylum and withholding of deportation, and ordered her excluded and deported from the United States" in 1995, Kassindja was unanimously granted asylum in June 1996 by the Board of Immigration Appeals, setting national precedent and establishing gender-based persecution as grounds for seeking asylum in the U.S. Following the case, Kassindja and Miller-Muro co-authored a memoir, published by Random House, titled Do They Hear You When You Cry (1998).

Spurred by the widespread media coverage of Kassindja's case, the United States Congress passed legislation to define female genital mutilation/cutting on a minor as a federal criminal offense, which went into effect on March 30, 1997.

After discovering that few organizations offered legal assistance to women seeking asylum or refugee status in the Washington, D.C. area, Miller-Muro founded the Tahirih Justice Center to build on the accomplishments of Matter of Kasinga and to provide free legal services to immigrant women and girls fleeing to the U.S. from gender-based violence. In 1998, Tahirih hired its first paid staff to represent women seeking asylum from gender-based persecution.

In 1999, Tahirih litigated the Matter of Adeniji, a precedent-setting decision that clarified that mandatory detention provisions contained in the Illegal Immigration Reform and Immigrant Responsibility Act of 1996 could not apply retroactively.

2000–2005 
During this period, Tahirih launched its Public Policy Advocacy Program and began offering in-house social services case management to its clients.

In 2000, Tahirih advised the U.S. State Department in the conceptual development of legislation that became the Victims of Trafficking and Violence Protection Act, which established new visas for victims of trafficking (T visas) and victims of serious crimes (U visas). As a result, Tahirih began representing survivors of human trafficking and working closely with the Immigration and Naturalization Service (INS) to ensure compliance with the distribution of T and U and visas.

In 2001, Tahirih launched the Campaign to Prevent Abuse and Exploitation through the International Marriage Broker (IMB) Industry to address the abuse of so-called "mail-order brides". Alongside law firm Arnold & Porter Kaye Scholer, Tahirih successfully litigated Fox v. Encounters International in 2004, a case that marked the first time in the United States that an IMB had been held liable for negligent conduct that put a woman at serious risk in an abusive relationship and kept her in danger by misleading her as to her legal options.

Drafted by Tahirih, the International Marriage Broker Regulation Act of 2005 (IMBRA) was passed by Congress and signed into law by President George W. Bush as part of the reauthorized Violence Against Women Act. IMBRA enabled foreign women to receive critical information before marrying men through these agencies, as it "requires that the U.S. Government provide foreign fiancé(e)s and spouses immigrating to the U.S. information about their legal rights as well as criminal or domestic violence histories of their U.S. citizen fiancé(e)s and spouses".

2006–2010 
During this period, Tahirih expanded its services and field office locations, beginning to offer family law representation and opening its first satellite offices in Houston, Texas and Baltimore, Maryland.

In 2008, Tahirih filed an amicus brief for the Second Circuit Court of Appeals in the case of Barry v. Mukasey, arguing that FGM/C can cause permanent and continuing harm to women who are forced to undergo the procedure, often leading to ongoing health issues. Barry was denied asylum as a direct result of the Board of Immigration Appeals decision in Matter of A-T-, where the court held that past FGM/C alone cannot provide a basis for a fear of future persecution, and Matter of A-K-, where the court held that a parent cannot receive derivative asylum to protect a United States citizen child from FGM/C.

In 2009, Tahirih released a report titled Precarious Protection: How Unsettled Policy and Current Laws Harm Women and Girls Fleeing Persecution, which addressed the gaps in gender-based asylum protection and how women and girls are especially impacted by current immigration laws and policies for asylum seekers, including expedited removal, mandatory detention, and the one-year filing deadline. Following the release of this report, Tahirih worked with congressional representatives to introduce the Restoring Protection for Victims of Persecution Act in 2010, a bill to amend the Immigration and Nationality Act to eliminate the one-year filing deadline for applications for asylum in the U.S. However, the bill was not enacted.

With provisions to strengthen the protections for women and girls fleeing gender-based persecution drafted by Tahirih, the Refugee Protection Act of 2010 was introduced to amend the Immigration and Nationality Act and reaffirm the United States commitment to protecting refugees and asylum-seekers fleeing persecution in their home countries, although this bill was not enacted.

2011–present 
Continuing its expansion, Tahirih opened an office in the San Francisco Bay Area and in Atlanta.

In 2011, Tahirih conducted the first-ever national survey on forced marriage in immigrant communities in the United States, which documented as many as 3,000 cases of forced marriage in the U.S. over a two-year period. In response to the results of the survey, Tahirih launched its Forced Marriage Initiative and National Network to Prevent Forced Marriage.

Tahirih began its campaign to end child marriage in the United States with the aim of changing state laws that make child marriage legal and fail to protect minors from "forced marriage, human trafficking, and statutory rape disguised as marriage". In 2016, Tahirih drafted and advocated for the bipartisan passage of SB 415 / HB 703, a bill that made Virginia the first state in the country to limit marriage to legal adults, meaning individuals over the age of 18 or court-emancipated 16- or 17-year-olds. The bill, which addressed findings that 4,500 children had been married in Virginia between 2004 and 2014 according to the Virginia Department of Health, was signed into law by Governor Terry McAuliffe and went into effect on July 1, 2016.

In Texas, Tahirih helped draft and drive forward SB 1705 / HB 3932, a bill that limits marriage to adults age 18 or older, with an exception only for court-emancipated 16- or 17-year-olds who have been given the full legal rights of an adult. The bill, signed into law by Governor Greg Abbott in June 2017, helped close the legal loopholes that made Texas the state with some of the highest number of child marriages in the country.

In August 2017, Tahirih released Falling Through the Cracks: How Laws Allow Child Marriage to Happen in Today's America, a report that analyzed the minimum marriage age laws in all 50 states and the District of Columbia, providing state lawmakers and advocates with the information they need to pass laws that protect children from the harms of child marriage.

Tahirih has spoken out against the Presidential Executive Orders on immigration issued in 2017. On March 28, 2017, Tahirih testified before the House Judiciary Committee's Subcommittee on Immigration and Border Security on the impact of Executive Order 13768 titled Enhancing Public Safety in the Interior of the United States on immigrant survivors of gender-based violence.

Following the release of the United States Department of Homeland Security's new Victim Information and Notification Exchange (DHS-VINE) in 2017, Tahirih and partner organizations discovered that this public database contained identifying information about immigrant victims of domestic violence, human trafficking, and other crimes. Tahirih requested that Immigration Customs and Enforcement (ICE) immediately remove all confidential information from the database, citing that DHS was prohibited from disclosing such information under federal statute. In response to Tahirih's advocacy, ICE removed the federally-protected information from DHS-VINE.

2014-present: The Bighearted Campaign

The Bighearted Campaign is a fundraiser event that the Tahirih Justice Center has been carrying out since the year of 2014. The Bighearted Campaign was originated in hopes of raising money to support and assist with victims of domestic violence, torture, forced marriages, genital mutilation, honor crimes and more. The victims and their situations can vary as far as placement. Some persons in need are within the United States of America while others are attempting to gain access to entry into the country. The funds raised will be used to support legal fees, provide shelter, attend educational courses, and provide utensils to properly service victims. The Tahirih Justice Center typically runs this fundraiser during the winter holiday season up to 4 weeks, and the center goals to earn as much as $175,000 from supporters to help support victims. Donations are collected via email online, in person, or through other outlets listed on the official Tahirih Justice Center website.

Operations

Tahirih offers legal services and social services case management, policy advocacy, and training and education with the aim of protecting immigrant women and girls fleeing gender-based violence.

Legal and social services

Tahirih provides legal services for immigrant women and girls, with expertise in the areas of gender-based asylum, Violence Against Women Act Petitions, T Visas, U Visas, and Special Immigrant Juvenile Status. Tahirih also provides family law services, engages in civil law, including appellate advocacy and impact litigation, and connects clients to social services.

Tahirih utilizes the services of pro bono attorneys, medical providers, and other professionals to serve its clients.

Public policy advocacy

Tahirih's engages in non-partisan public policy advocacy focused on ensuring that U.S. laws and policies protect immigrant women and girls from violence and exploitation.

Tahirih's policy advocacy focus areas include protecting the rights of immigrant survivors of crime, promoting access to asylum for women and girls fleeing gender-based persecution, ending the detention of refugee women and children, preventing abuse and exploitation through the international marriage broker industry, and addressing protection gaps for individuals facing forced marriages.

Forced marriage protection

Through its Forced Marriage Initiative, Tahirih provides support and assistance to individuals in the United States who are facing or fleeing forced marriage in the U.S. or abroad.

Training and education 

Tahirih offers training and education programs to front-line professionals, including attorneys, judges, police officers, healthcare staff, and social service providers in order to help them support immigrant survivors of gender-based violence.

Organization and structure 
The Tahirih Justice Center is governed by a Board of Directors consisting of 15 independent voting members that oversee the organization's functions, establish its strategic direction, and maintain the organization's financial health. Each field office also has locally based advisory councils that provide guidance and ambassadorship for the organization. Archi Pyati is CEO and Layli Miller-Muro is Founder.

Tahirih currently has offices in Greater Washington, District of Columbia, Baltimore, Maryland, Houston, Texas, and the San Francisco Bay Area, California.

Criticism
International marriage broker agencies cite the alleged low levels of divorce among their clients, compared with the American national average, as proof of success. Tahirih counters that many of the men who use these brokers are repeat abusers looking for their next victim. Miller-Muro, Tahirih's Executive Director, stated that "The agencies have a financial incentive to ensure the satisfaction of their paying clients – the men – but there is no comparable incentive to safeguard the woman."

When describing the Matter of Kasinga and the associated media attention, anthropologist Charles Piot was concerned about the perpetration of possibly negative and racist stereotypes about Africa. In an analysis of several New York Times articles about the case, Piot called the "evocation of images of the immutable nature of patriarchal tradition" in Africa "extraordinary". Tahirih argues that several cultural practices in the world have adverse health effects that often go unnoticed because of poor education among the local community. Tahirih posits that many of the subjects who undergo practices such as female genital cutting are uninformed about the potential pain and other consequences that result from it. Since Tahirih views these issues as ones relating to human rights, it believes in the protection of individuals who may experience these acts.

Publications 
 Precarious Protection: How Unsettled Policy and Current Laws Harm Women and Girls Fleeing Persecution (2009)
 Forced Marriage in Immigrant Communities in the United States (2011)
 Righting the Wrong: Why Detention of Asylum-Seeking Mothers and Children in America Must End (2015)
 Understanding State Statutes on Minimum Marriage Age and Exceptions (2016)
 Falling Through the Cracks: How Laws Allow Child Marriage to Happen in Today's America (2017)

Awards and recognitions

Tahirih Justice Center 
 2016 Hispanic Bar Association of DC Hugh A. Johnson Jr. Memorial Award (Greater DC Office)
 2014 Social Impact Business Plan Exchange Competition Finalist
 2013 Night Court Pro Bono Award (Houston, Texas Office)
 2008 The Washingtonian Best Local Charities Award
 2007 Washington Post Award for Excellence in Non-Profit Management
 2002 The Washington Area Women's Foundation Leadership Award

See also
 Outline of domestic violence

Notes

References
`Abdu'l-Bahá. The Promulgation of Universal Peace. Wilmette, Illinois: Baháʼí Publishing Trust, 1982. .
Abusharaf, Rogaia Mustafa, ed. Female Circumcision: Multicultural Perspectives. Philadelphia: University of Pennsylvania Press, 2006. .
Kassindja, Fauziya and Miller-Muro, Layli. Do They Hear You When You Cry. New York: Random House Inc., 1998. .

External links

Guidestar: Tahirih Justice Center organization details
Humantrafficking.org – Tahirih Justice Center
Iranian Paralegal from Botswana Seeks Justice for Immigrant Women in U.S.
The Meyer Foundation – Tahirih Justice Center
 A video report on Tahirih Justice Center, by Leyla Haidarian, May 29, 2007, elham.tv (11 min 39 sec). Note: A very small spoken part of this reportage is in Persian without English subtitles.

Human rights organizations based in the United States
Non-profit organizations based in Falls Church, Virginia
Organizations established in 1997
Child marriage in the United States
Women in Virginia